Nechay is a surname. Notable people with the surname include:

 (1899–1974), Polish journalist
Mykhailo Nechay (1930–2011), Ukrainian molfar
Sergei Nechay (born 1968), Russian football official and player
Danylo Nechay (1612–1651), Ukrainian military commander